

 is an Apollo near-Earth object roughly  in diameter. It was discovered by the Mount Lemmon Survey on 8 April 2021. On 12 April 2021 13:01 UTC it passed  from the surface of Earth. The uncertainty in the close approach distance was ±30 km.

The Earth approach caused the asteroid to migrate inward and reduced the orbital period by roughly 71 days (from 678 days to 607 days). As a result of the orbit change, it came to its next perihelion (closest approach to the Sun) on 6 May 2021.

Thousands of fireballs occur every day.

References

External links 
 
 

Minor planet object articles (unnumbered)
Discoveries by MLS
20210412
2021408